The GT World Challenge Europe Sprint Cup, officially known as Fanatec GT World Challenge Europe Powered by AWS for sponsorship reasons, formerly the FIA GT Series, is a sports car racing series organized by the Stéphane Ratel Organisation (SRO) with the approval of the Fédération Internationale de l'Automobile (FIA). It was sponsored by Blancpain from 2014 to 2019, when it was variously branded as the Blancpain Sprint Series in 2014 and 2015, the Blancpain GT Series Sprint Cup in 2016 to 2018, and the Blancpain GT World Challenge Europe in 2019. In 2020, AWS was named 'Official Presenter' and the series was branded as "GT World Challenge Powered by AWS". Fanatec later joined as title sponsor in 2021, giving the series its current name.

The championship now exclusively races in Europe, but had in previous years visited other continents, including Asia. The series continues the sprint format for GT-cars carried out by the defunct FIA GT1 World Championship.

Regulations
The GT World Challenge Europe Sprint Cup is contested with GT3-spec cars. Each event consists of two races over a weekend with two drivers per car and a mandatory pit stop.

Races
The schedule of the GT World Challenge Europe Sprint Cup consists of races in Europe.

History
In 2013, the FIA GT Series was created after the demise of the FIA GT1 World Championship and the FIA GT3 European Championship. The series was supposed to form the FIA GT World Series in conjunction with the GT Endurance Series. This plan was abandoned before the start of the 2013 season.

The name of the FIA GT Series resembles the FIA GT Championship (1997-2009) that was known for its endurance races all over the world. Except for the mandatory driver changes, the two championships differ highly in sporting and technical regulations.

In 2014, the competition changed the name to the Sprint Series.

in 2016 the SRO announced both the Sprint and Endurance Series integrated into the GT Series, putting the emphasis on the overall drivers' and manufacturers' titles causing the Sprint Series name to change from Sprint Series to GT Series Sprint Cup.

On 25 May 2018, the SRO acquired promotional rights to the GT World Challenge America, a North American GT series sanctioned by the United States Auto Club. On 29 September 2018, the SRO changed the names of the GT Asia and Sprint Cup, to adopt the World Challenge name used in North America. The three series together will be known as the GT World Challenge, with each series adding their region to the series name (America, Asia, Europe).

In 2019, SRO announced that sponsorship by Blancpain had come to an end. For 2020, the GT World Challenge Europe was renamed the GT World Challenge Europe Sprint Cup, with the GT Series and GT Series Endurance Cup being renamed the GT World Challenge Europe and GT World Challenge Europe Endurance Cup respectively.

In 2020, SRO named AWS as the "official presenter" of the series, and the series was branded as "GT World Challenge Powered by AWS". In 2021, Fanatec became the title sponsor of the series. Giving the series its current name of "Fanatec GT World Challenge Europe Powered by AWS".

Champions

Drivers

Teams

See also
 GT World Challenge America
 GT World Challenge Asia
 GT World Challenge Europe
 GT World Challenge Europe Endurance Cup

References

External links

Sports car racing series
 
Group GT3